Hotellet (Danish original title: The Hotel) is a Danish television series that originally aired on Danish channel TV 2 between 2000–2002.

The series follows the Faber family and their life and work at the family hotel.

Cast
Peter Schrøder
Kirsten Olesen
Martin Hestbæk
Anne-Grethe Bjarup Riis
Trine Appel
Paw Henriksen
Bjarne Henriksen
Søren Byder
Sarah Boberg
Lene Maria Christensen
Jamile Massalkhi
Baard Owe

External links 

2000 Danish television series debuts
2002 Danish television series endings
2000s Danish television series
Fictional hotels
Danish-language television shows
DR TV original programming